Ralph Hosea Chaplin (1887–1961) was an American writer, artist and labor activist.

Background
Chaplin was born in 1887.  At the age of seven, he saw a worker shot dead during the Pullman Strike in Chicago, Illinois. He had moved with his family from Ames, Kansas to Chicago in 1893.

Career

During a time in Mexico he was influenced by hearing of the execution squads established by Porfirio Díaz, and became a supporter of Emiliano Zapata. 

On his return, he began work in various union positions, most of which were poorly paid. Some of Chaplin's early artwork was done for the International Socialist Review and other Charles H. Kerr publications.

For two years Chaplin worked in the strike committee with Mother Jones for the bloody Kanawha County, West Virginia strike of coal miners in 1912–13. These influences led him to write a number of labor oriented poems, one of which became the words for the oft-sung union anthem, "Solidarity Forever".

Chaplin then became active in the Industrial Workers of the World (the IWW, or "Wobblies") and became editor of its eastern U.S. publication Solidarity. In 1917 Chaplin and some 100 other Wobblies were rounded up, convicted, and jailed under the Espionage Act of 1917 for conspiring to hinder the draft and encourage desertion. He wrote Bars And Shadows: The Prison Poems while serving four years of a 20-year sentence.

Although he continued to work for labor rights after his release from prison, Chaplin was very disillusioned by the aftermath of the Russian Revolution and the evolution of the Soviet state and international communism, particularly its involvement in American politics and unions in 1920–1948, as he details in his autobiography, Wobbly.

Chaplin maintained his involvement with the IWW, serving in Chicago as editor of its newspaper, the Industrial Worker, from 1932 to 1936.

Eventually Chaplin settled in Tacoma, Washington, where he edited the local labor publication. From 1949 until his death, he was curator of manuscripts for the Washington State Historical Society.

Death
Chaplin died in 1961.

Legacy

According to the IWW, Chaplin likely designed the now widely used anarcho-syndicalist image, the black cat. As its stance indicates, the cat is meant to suggest wildcat strikes and radical unionism.

In 2022, law professor Ahmed White included Chaplin in his book on the IWW called Under the Iron Heel.

Works

There are ten entries for Chaplin's works in the Library of Congress online catalog.

Illustrations
 Out of the Dump (1909)

Poetry
 When the Leaves Come Out and Other Rebel Verses (1917)
 Bars and Shadows:  The Prison Poems (1922)
 Bars and Shadows:  The Prison Poems (1923)

Nonfiction
 The Centralia Conspiracy (1920)
 The Centralia Conspiracy:  The Truth About the Armistice Tragedy (1924)
Centralia Case:  Three Views (1971)
 American Labor's Case Against Communism:  How the Operations of Stalin's Red Quislings Look from Inside the Labor Movement (1947)
 Wobbly: The Rough-and-Tumble Story of an American Radical (1948)
 Wobbly: The Rough-and-Tumble Story of an American Radical (1972)

Articles
 "Confessions of a Radical," two-part article in Empire Magazine of the Denver Post (February 17, 1957,  pp. 12–13, and February 24, 1957, pp. 10–11)
"Why I Wrote Solidarity Forever," American West, vol. 5, no. 1 (January 1968), 18–27, 73

See also
 Solidarity Forever

References

External links 
 
 
 
 
 
 
 CHAPLIN, Ralph Hosea (1887-1961), papers, 6 l.f. Special Collections, Washington State Historical Society
  Grave of Ralph Chaplin Calvary Cemetery, Tacoma, Washington

1887 births
1961 deaths
American trade union leaders
American newspaper editors
American male poets
Industrial Workers of the World leaders
Industrial Workers of the World members
People convicted under the Espionage Act of 1917
Songwriters from Kansas
American male non-fiction writers